Madhusudhan Tiwari was a Bharatiya Janata Party politician from Assam. He was elected to the Assam Legislative Assembly  in 1991 from Patharkandi constituency.

References 

Living people
Bharatiya Janata Party politicians from Assam
21st-century Indian politicians
Assam MLAs 1991–1996
People from Morigaon district
Year of birth missing (living people)